Papaioannou is a Greek surname. Notable people with the surname include:

Charalampos Papaioannou (born 1972), Greek judoka
Dimitris Papaioannou (born 1964), Greek choreographer, director, dancer and artist
Ezekias Papaioannou (1908–1988), Cypriot politician
Giannis Papaioannou (1913–1972), Greek songwriter
Ioánnis Papaïoánnou (born 1976), Greek chess grandmaster
Konstantinos Papaioannou (1899–1979), Greek physicist and mathematician
Makis Papaioannou (born 1977), Cypriot footballer
Mimis Papaioannou (born 1942), Greek footballer
Pavlos Papaioannou (born 1959), Greek footballer
Sofia Papaioannou (born 1969), Greek journalist
Yiannis Papaioannou (1910–1989), Greek composer
Pantelis Papaioannou (1880s-1907), Greek leader of the Macedonian Struggle

Greek-language surnames
Surnames
Patronymic surnames